The 1940 United States presidential election in Georgia took place on November 5, 1940, as part of the wider United States presidential election. Voters chose 12 representatives, or electors, to the Electoral College, who voted for president and vice president.

Background
With the exception of a handful of historically Unionist North Georgia counties – chiefly Fannin but also to a lesser extent Pickens, Gilmer and Towns – Georgia since the 1880s had been a one-party state dominated by the Democratic Party. Disfranchisement of almost all African-Americans and most poor whites had made the Republican Party virtually nonexistent outside of local governments in those few hill counties, and the national Democratic Party served as the guardian of white supremacy against a Republican Party historically associated with memories of Reconstruction. The only competitive elections were Democratic primaries, which state laws restricted to whites on the grounds of the Democratic Party being legally a private club.

Secretary of State John B. Wilson refused to allow Earl Browder, the nominee of the Communist Party USA, to appear on the ballot stating that the party was in violation of a Georgian law which prohibited "candidates of a party which seeks to overthrow our democratic constitutional form of government" from appearing on the ballot. The Georgia General Assembly later passed restrictive ballot access legislation in 1943, which required petitions to have signatures from at least five percent of registered voters. The Atlanta Journal-Constitution stated that the legislation was passed in order to "sustain Secretary of State John B. Wilson in refusing a Communist candidate for president a place on the Georgia ballot in the 1940 election".

Georgia would later lower its voting age from twenty-one to eighteen in 1943.

Vote
The Roosevelt/Wallace ticket easily carried the state of Georgia on election day.

Results

Results by county

Notes

References

Georgia
1940
1940 Georgia (U.S. state) elections